4 is the fourth album of Los Hermanos band, released in 2005. Like the previous album, won gold status (50,000 copies sold).

Track listing

Personnel

Los Hermanos
Marcelo Camelo – Vocals, Guitar
Rodrigo Amarante – Vocals, Guitar
Rodrigo Barba – Drums
Bruno Medina – Musical keyboard

Additional musicians 
Aldivas Ayres – Trombone
Gabriel Bubu – Guitar, bass
Fernando Catatau – Guitar
Jésse Sadoc Filho – Trumpet
Jota Moraes – 	Vibraphone on "Sapato Novo"
Eduardo Morelenbaum – Arranger, Clarinet
Paschoal Perrota – Arranger
Stephane San Juan – Percussion
Vittor Santos – Trombone
Francisco Soares – Trumpet

Production
Alexandre Kassin – producer, audio mixer, engineer
Daniel Carvalho – audio mixer
Ricardo Garcia – mastering
Simon Fuller – Executive Producer
Luizão Dantas – Studio Assistant
Igor Ferreira – Studio Assistant
Fernando Fischgold – Studio Assistant
Leonardo Moreira – Studio Assistant

Design
Bruno Batista – art direction, design
Daniela Conolly – art supervisor
Sandro Mesquita – Graphic Coordinator

Certifications

References

Los Hermanos albums
2005 albums